Pantanassa, meaning "Queen of All", is one of the traditional epithets of the Virgin Mary in Greek Orthodoxy. It can refer to:

Churches 
 Church of the Pantanassa, Athens, Greece 
 Pantanassa Monastery Mystras, Greece
 Pantanassa, a monastery of the Greek Orthodox Archdiocese of Australia in Mangrove Creek, New South Wales, Australia

Settlements 
 Pantanassa, Aetolia-Acarnania
 Pantanassa, Arta
 Pantanassa, Laconia
 Pantanassa, Rethymno